Cynthia E. Rosenzweig (née Ropes) (born c. 1958) is an American agronomist and climatologist at NASA Goddard Institute for Space Studies, located at Columbia University, "who helped pioneer the study of climate change and agriculture." She is an adjunct senior research scientist at the Columbia Climate School and has over 300 publications, over 80 peer-reviewed articles, has authored or edited eight books. She has also served in many different organizations working to develop plans to manage climate change, at the global level with the IPCC as well as in New York City after Hurricane Sandy.

Education and academic career
Rosenzweig attended Cook College (at Rutgers University) earning a Bachelor of Arts degree in agricultural sciences in 1980. Rosenzweig's focus on agriculture began in 1969, when she and her future husband rented and operated a farm in Tuscany, Italy, picking grapes and olives and raising animals like goats, pigs, ducks, and geese. She decided to return to university to study agriculture, earning a Master of Science degree in Soils and Crops from Rutgers University in 1983.  During her Master's, she was hired by NASA Goddard Institute for Space Studies to study cropland using satellite data. She then earned her Ph.D. from the University of Massachusetts Amherst in Plant, Soil and Environmental Sciences in 1991.

She has continued working for NASA, where she has been the head of the Climate Impacts Group since 1993.  Her work with the IPCC Task Force on Data was recognized when the 2007 Nobel Peace Prize was awarded jointly to Al Gore and the IPCC.

She also currently serves as an adjunct professor at Barnard College and is also an adjunct senior research scientist at the Columbia Climate School at Columbia University.

Community engagement and advocacy 
While at NASA and Columbia's Goddard Institute for Space Studies, Rosenzweig has pioneered the study of climate change's impact on agriculture and human cities.  She has been involved in numerous working groups attempting to assess and establish plans for managing climate change, including:

 Co-Chair, New York City Panel on Climate Change
 Co-Leader, Metropolitan East Coast Regional Assessment of the U.S. National Assessment of the Potential Consequences of Climate Variability and Change, sponsored by the U.S. Global Change Research Program
 Coordinating Lead Author of the IPCC Working Group II Fourth Assessment Report ("Observed Changes" chapter)
Coordinating Lead Author of the IPCC Special Report on Climate Change and Land
 Member, IPCC Task Group on Data and Scenarios for Impact and Climate Assessment
 Co-Editor, UCCRN First Assessment Report on Climate Change and Cities (ARC3).
 Panel member of the New York City Panel on Climate Change.
Co-founder and member of the Executive Committee of the Agricultural Model Intercomparison and Improvement Project (AgMIP)
On October 20, 2022  Rosenzweig was awarded the World Food Prize.
Rosenzweig founded the Agricultural Model Intercomparison and Improvement Project in 2010

Publications
An overview of Rosenzweig's research can be obtained at her Google Scholar profile. A complete list of her publications can be obtained from her bibliography on the NASA Goodard Institute for Space Studies website.

 C.L. Rosenzweig & M.L. Parry, "Climate Change and Agriculture", 1990
 
 Testimony before Congress, April 17, 2007.

Awards
Guggenheim Fellow
GSFC Honor Award - Science (2011)
GISS Best Publication Award (2009)
GSFC Honor Award - Earth Science Achievement (2007)
Fellow, American Association for the Advancement of Science (2006)
Named as one of Nature's 10: Ten People Who Mattered in 2012" by the journal Nature
World Food Prize (2022)

References

Further reading
 "An Interview with Dr. Cynthia Rosenzweig of NASA – Q&A with Anna Lappé", Take a Bite Out of Climate Change, Sept. 2008 (interview transcript)
 "Dr. Cynthia Rosenzweig Talks About Urban Climate Change Solutions at Michigan State University", April 9, 2010 (video)
 "Earth Science: Putting the Puzzle Together" (NASA profile of Rosenzweig for children)
 Kristin Jobin, "NASA Scientist Cynthia Rosenzweig", MLive, May 2010

American climatologists
Women climatologists
NASA people
Columbia University faculty
Barnard College faculty
Fellows of the American Association for the Advancement of Science
Rutgers University alumni
University of Massachusetts Amherst College of Natural Sciences alumni
Women earth scientists
Year of birth missing (living people)
Living people
Scarsdale High School alumni
20th-century American scientists
20th-century American women scientists
21st-century American scientists
21st-century American women scientists
Climate change mitigation researchers